Zemlyanukha is a rural locality (a settlement) in Barnaul, Altai Krai, Russia. The population was 82 as of 2013. There are 3 streets.

Geography 
Zemlyanukha is located 17 km northwest of Barnaul by road. Gonba is the nearest rural locality.

References 

Rural localities in Barnaul urban okrug